Camponotus novaeboracensis, the New York carpenter ant, is a species of ant in the family Formicidae. It is found in the Nearctic.

References

Further reading

 
 

novaeboracensis
Articles created by Qbugbot
Insects described in 1855